High Synagogue was financed by Mordechai Maisel, and it was finished in 1568, the same year as the Jewish Town Hall. Probably it was modelled after High Synagogue, Kraków, which was built in 1556 in Poland. The house was designed by P. Roder in Renaissance style (supervising builder was master Rada). It was designed as a preaching place for councilors of Jewish town hall. In the center there were bimah, surrounded by seats. Mordechai Maisel gave pieces of Torah and silver tools to the synagogue. The stucco ceiling was gothic ribbed vaulting.

In 1689 it was destroyed by the Great Fire. The synagogue was reconstructed.

In 1883 the synagogue was rebuilt by J. M. Wertmüller. During this modification the facade was simplified to the modern appearance.

In 1907 the eastern entrance was closed, and a new entrance was made facing Red Street (Červená ulice).

Other reconstructions were during 1961, 1974–79 and 1982.

During the Nazi and communist rule, the synagogue was part of Jewish Museum and there was an exhibition of old Hebrew books.

Religious buildings and structures completed in 1568
Synagogues completed in 1883
Synagogues in Prague
16th-century synagogues
1568 establishments in the Holy Roman Empire
Josefov (Prague)
19th-century religious buildings and structures in the Czech Republic